Giovanni Gonzaga (1474 – 23 September 1525) was an Italian nobleman of the House of Gonzaga,  born at Mantua.

He was the youngest child of Federico I Gonzaga, Marquess of Mantua. In 1494 he married Laura Bentivoglio, daughter of Giovanni II Bentivoglio, de facto lord of Bologna. As the lords of Vescovato, they started a branch of the Gonzaga family that survived until at least the 1990s.

1474 births
1525 deaths
Giovanni
Nobility of Mantua